Hallie may refer to:

Places
Hallie, Wisconsin, a town in the United States
Lake Hallie, Wisconsin, a village incorporated into the above town
Hallie, Kentucky, an unincorporated community in the United States

People

Given name
Hallie (given name)

Surname
Philip Hallie (1922–1994), American author
Gerard Hallie (1911–2002), Dutch coxswain

Fictional characters
Hallie Clemens, in the American television series Rita Rocks
Hallie Parker, in the 1998 film The Parent Trap
Hallie Stokes, in the American soap opera Dark Shadows
Hallie Takahama, a Marvel comics character known as Jolt

See also
Tropical Storm Hallie, one of two storms
Halle (disambiguation)
Halli (disambiguation)
Hallı (disambiguation)